Stomatium is a genus of succulent plants in the ice plant family, Aizoaceae. Members of the genus are native to southern Africa.

Species
Stomatium acutifolium L.Bolus
Stomatium agninum Schwantes
Stomatium alboroseum L.Bolus
Stomatium angustifolium L.Bolus
Stomatium beaufortense L.Bolus
Stomatium bolusiae Schwantes
Stomatium braunsii L.Bolus
Stomatium bryantii L.Bolus
Stomatium deficiens L.Bolus
Stomatium difforme L.Bolus
Stomatium duthieae L.Bolus
Stomatium ermininum Schwantes
Stomatium fulleri L.Bolus
Stomatium geoffreyi L.Bolus
Stomatium gerstneri L.Bolus
Stomatium grandidens L.Bolus
Stomatium integrum L.Bolus
Stomatium jamesii L.Bolus
Stomatium latifolium L.Bolus
Stomatium lesliei (Schwantes) Volk
Stomatium leve L.Bolus
Stomatium loganii L.Bolus
Stomatium meyeri L.Bolus
Stomatium middelburgense L.Bolus
Stomatium murinum (Haw.) Schwantes ex Jacobsen
Stomatium mustelinum Schwantes
Stomatium patulum L.Bolus ex Jacobsen 
Stomatium paucidens L.Bolus
Stomatium peersii L.Bolus
Stomatium pluridens L.Bolus
Stomatium resedolens L.Bolus
Stomatium ronaldii L.Bolus
Stomatium rouxii L.Bolus
Stomatium ryderae L.Bolus
Stomatium suaveolens Schwantes
Stomatium suricatinum L.Bolus
Stomatium trifarium L.Bolus
Stomatium villetii L.Bolus
Stomatium viride L.Bolus

References

 
Aizoaceae genera
Succulent plants